St. Louis County Library (SLCL) is a library system that serves residents of St. Louis County, Missouri, United States. It is the busiest public library in Missouri, circulating more than 12 million items in 2011. It consists of 20 branches, including the Headquarters branch, which is located at 1640 S. Lindbergh Blvd in Ladue, Missouri.

St. Louis County Library is supported by the St. Louis County Library District, which includes most of St. Louis County. SLCL has reciprocal borrowing agreements with most of the other libraries in St. Louis County, as well as with the St. Louis Public Library and the St. Charles City-County Library. In 2018 the library joined the MOBIUS and Prospector loan systems.

The St. Louis County Library District is governed by a Board of Trustees, consisting of five members appointed by the County Council based on a recommendation of the County Executive. The Board of trustees is responsible for selecting and appointing a Library Director. The Director is the chief executive officer of the Library and is responsible for the execution of the orders and policies adopted by the Board. Information concerning the establishment and governance of the Library District can be found in Chapter 182 of the Missouri State Statutes.

History  
The St. Louis County Library District was established as a political subdivision of the State of Missouri with taxing authority by an election held in April 1946. The first library building opened in 1947 and was quickly followed by two branch locations. The 1960s saw an additional four branches, including a new headquarters building and the first of many building expansions. This building boom resulted in the construction of branches throughout the 523 square miles of the county. A tax levy passed in 1973 allowed the library to add 12 branches to the system, bringing the total number of branch locations to 20.

In 2020, St. Louis County Library announced that it will no longer charge fines on late materials. Patrons will still be required to pay for lost or damaged materials. In 2021, it was announced that St. Louis County Library and St. Louis City Library will begin sharing an Integrated Library System the following year. The integrated system will make it possible for patrons of both libraries to check out or view materials from either library. Patrons will not require a new library card.

Collections & Services  
Items available to borrow include books, DVDs, CDs, audiobooks, video games, binoculars, laptops (along with WiFi hotspots), fishing equipment, musical instruments, projectors, and telescopes. Patrons also have access to various online resources, downloadable eBooks, audiobooks, magazines, and some web streaming content (movies and TV).

The loan period for all materials is 14 days, except for Inter-Library Loans (21 days), MOBIUS Books (28 days), and MOBIUS Audiovisual (AV) equipment (10 days).

In addition to books and other library materials, SLCL offers free programs and services including computer classes, small business assistance, job help, storytimes, STEM programming, summer and winter reading clubs, individualized help, and more. Individual branches offer a variety of programs as well as public computers, meeting spaces, free public WiFi, fax services, printing, document, and book scanning.

St. Louis County Library is a part of MOBIUS—a partnership of libraries providing patrons with access to over 60 million items from academic, special, and public libraries. Patrons can request MOBIUS materials through the MOBIUS online catalog with delivery to their local branch in less than five days.

Borrowing Limits 
There a maximum number of each type of item a patron can have checked out at one time. The limits are:

 100 books
 Combined total of 25 CDs (Music and Audiobooks) and Playaways
 25 DVDs
 Combined total of 5 Fishing Kits, Musical Instruments, Telescopes, and Wi-Fi Hotspots
 1 pair of Binoculars
 2 video games
 1 portable Projector
 5 Inter-Library Loans (of any type)
 10 materials checked out from MOBIUS

The total limit of materials (of any type) checked out at any one time is 100.

History & Genealogy Department 

Founded in 1998, History & Genealogy at St. Louis County library features a research collection of over 95,000 print volumes, 850 periodical titles, and over 40,000 microfilms. History & Genealogy's collection offers unique genealogical and historical sources emphasizing the St. Louis Metropolitan area, the state of Missouri, and states and foreign countries that fed migration into Missouri. History & Genealogy offers access to substantial holdings for Atlantic states, the Northwest Territory, the Louisiana Purchase, and sources for Canada, Germany, Switzerland, France, and the British Isles. At its core are the collections of the St. Louis County Library and the St. Louis Genealogical Society.

In 2002, History & Genealogy at St. Louis County Library became the official home of the National Genealogical Society Collection, which includes over 30,000 items available for circulation or by inter-library loan. Other collections have followed including the William C.E. and Bessie Becker Collection (German, Swiss, British Isles), the Lewis Bunker Rohrbach Collection (Atlantic States, British Isles, Swiss), the Joy A. Reisinger Collection (French Canadian, Northwest Territory), the Julius K. Hunter and Friends African American Collection, the Mary Berthold Reference Collection, and the St. Louis Jewish Genealogical Society Collection.

History & Genealogy's equipment includes microfilm reader-printers, over-head book scanner, photocopiers, wi-fi, and free access to genealogical and historical research databases. History & Genealogy publishes the monthly newsletter PastPorts in support of historical and genealogical research. History & Genealogy is located at the Headquarters Branch and is open seven days per week. Groups and tours are welcomed by appointment.

Branches

References

External links

St. Louis County Library website
St. Louis County Library catalog
Map of branches
Libraries.org | https://librarytechnology.org/library/3062

Public libraries in Missouri
Buildings and structures in St. Louis County, Missouri
Education in St. Louis County, Missouri
1947 establishments in Missouri